Sāketa is a Sanskrit appellation of the city of Ayodhya. Saket can be alternatively used for the abode of Vaikuntha in Hindu epics, where liberated souls dwell."Saketa", the name of the Ayodhya Kingdom was later widespread by Buddhist travellers and far away traders for the collective name of the region's under this Kingdom. Overall, according to early chronicles found in Hindi, Bengali, Gujarati, Marathi, Sanskrit literature and Ramayana and Ramacharitamanasa the city bears name of Ayodhya Kingdom, not Sāketa.

In literature
Saket (1932), a famous Hindi epic poem by Maithili Sharan Gupt, a modern-version of Ramacharitamanasa, which described an ideal Hindu society and Rama as an ideal man. It is an account of the Ramayana through the eyes of Urmila, daughter of King Janaka of Mithila and the younger sister of Sita, who later became wife of Lakshmana.

In Buddhism
In Buddhism, the place is thought to be where the sons of Okkaka founded a city.

Ayodhya signifies a great importance in the Buddhist literature. It is referred to as Saketa in traditional Buddhist literature. British archaeologist Alexander Cunningham who was also the first director general of the ASI identified three Buddhist places — Mani Parbat, Kuber Parbat and Sugriv Parbat at the site of Ayodhya.

See also
 Mathura
 Dvaraka

References 

Locations in Hindu mythology